Ortahisar is a district and second level municipality in Trabzon Province, Turkey. According to Law act no 6360, all Turkish provinces with a population more than 750,000 would be metropolitan municipality and the districts within the metropolitan municipalities will be second-level municipalities. The law also creates new districts within the provinces in addition to present districts. These changes became effective by the local elections in 2014. On 30 March 2014, Ahmet Metin Genç (AKP) was elected mayor.

Thus after 2014 the present Trabzon central district was named Ortahisar and the name Trabzon is reserved for the metropolitan municipality.

In April 2021, archaeologists announced the discovery of Roman and Byzantine period archeological remains. The southern part of the wicker columns and fortifications of the Roman emperor Hadrian's period, trench walls of Byzantine period dating back to 1460 have been discovered. Remains of Roman tiles and pottery were also discovered during the excavations. According to the Trabzon City Municipality, the excavation area is planned to be turned into an open-air museum.

Places of Interest

 Fatih Mosque, Trabzon

Rural area
There were 9 towns and 38 villages in the rural area of Ortahisar. Now their official status became "neighborhood of Ortahisar".

References

Districts of Trabzon Province